Cenk Kadir Uygur (born March 21, 1970) is a Turkish-American progressive political commentator, media host, attorney, journalist, and politician. Uygur is the creator of The Young Turks, an American left-wing, sociopolitical, progressive news and commentary program. Before beginning his career as a political commentator, he worked briefly as an associate attorney in Washington, D.C. and New York City. As a young man, Uygur supported social conservative positions but as his views evolved he began to identify as a progressive. Uygur also co-founded the progressive political action committee Justice Democrats along with Zack Exley, Saikat Chakrabarti, and Kyle Kulinski.

In addition to hosting The Young Turks, Uygur appeared on MSNBC as a political commentator. From January to June 2011, he hosted a weeknight commentary show on the network; he was replaced by Al Sharpton. After leaving MSNBC, Uygur secured another weeknight commentary show on Current TV, which aired from December 5, 2011, to August 15, 2013. From 2012 to 2013, he was the chief news officer at Current TV, succeeding Keith Olbermann.

In 2020, Uygur was a candidate in both the special election as well as the regularly scheduled election for California's 25th congressional district to succeed former Representative Katie Hill, who resigned in 2019. His campaign was controversial due to Uygur having made numerous derogatory and vulgar comments about women, Jews and Muslims in the past. He lost both elections, coming in fourth place in both contests with 5.9% of the vote in the first race and 6.6% in the other.

Early life and education
Uygur was born in Istanbul, Turkey, and immigrated with his family to the United States when he was eight years old. He spent the remainder of his upbringing in East Brunswick, New Jersey, and graduated from East Brunswick High School. Uygur was raised in a secular Muslim household, but became more religious during college before becoming agnostic although he still identifies as a cultural Muslim. He graduated from the Wharton School of the University of Pennsylvania in 1992, where he majored in management, and was on the Student Activities Council representing the Turkish Students Association. While a student he wrote several articles that he has since disavowed, including a denial of the Armenian genocide and disparaging comments about women. He has received a Juris Doctor degree from Columbia Law School.

Career
After graduating from law school, Uygur worked as an associate attorney at the law firms of Drinker Biddle & Reath in Washington, D.C. and Hayes & Liebman in New York City. He began his broadcasting career by buying time on a local access channel in Washington, D.C., where he made regular political commentary on his show called The Young Turk. He first worked as a talk show host on a weekend radio show on WWRC in Washington, D.C., and on WRKO in Boston, Massachusetts. He later wrote for, produced, and appeared on the WAMI-TV news show, The Times in Miami, Florida, then started The Young Turks on Sirius Satellite Radio. In the 2000s, Uygur maintained a weekly blog on The Huffington Post and wrote entries that were critical of the 2003 Iraq war.

The Young Turks

Uygur created the talk show The Young Turks with the goal of starting a liberal-leaning political and entertainment show. It launched on the Sirius Satellite Radio network on February 14, 2002 and was also on the Air America radio network between 2006 and 2008. Uygur and his co-host Ana Kasparian applied a populist left branding and programming strategy that made TYT a successful global online organization, with larger numbers of YouTube subscribers than several other notable news networks like CNN. The show's name Young Turks has been criticized and called for change due to the original Young Turks political movement in the Ottoman Empire being responsible for committing the Armenian genocide, the Assyrian genocide, and the Greek genocide.

The Young Turks began a daily news video show on YouTube in 2015, and claims to have been the first on the streaming service. Uygur regularly states that The Young Turks is the largest online news show in the world, and has claimed so since at least 2011. It has amassed over 7.5 billion views on YouTube, and over 5 million subscribers. Leveraging the strength of The Young Turks talk show, Uygur expanded it into a network of channels and shows, beginning with Pop Trigger on July 5, 2007. As a network, The Young Turks has amassed over 8 billion views and over 13 million subscribers across all the platforms which they stream. Video of the show is streamed daily on its website, as well as on YouTube, YouTubeTV, via various streaming platforms, broadcast on a handful of local television channels throughout the US, and is available as a podcast.

In September 2011, a weeknight TV edition of the show was announced at 7 p.m. EST (M–F) on the network beginning sometime in the fourth quarter of 2011. The show on Current TV ended on August 15, 2013, with the end of all live programming on Current TV. In May 2018, The Young Turks launched its own TV format 24 hour channel on YouTube TV which includes both live and prerecorded programming.

Uygur hired his nephew Hasan Piker to work for the show.

MSNBC
As a result of exposure on the Air America radio network, MSNBC hired Uygur as a contributor and substitute anchor for the network on October 21, 2010. On January 21, 2011, Uygur was appointed as the host of the 6 p.m. Eastern slot on MSNBC as the anchor of a new prime time edition of MSNBC Live, after the network parted ways with Keith Olbermann, resulting in a rearrangement of the time slots of MSNBC's other prime time shows. Uygur filled the time slot vacated by Ed Schultz, from late January through June 2011, earning first among people 18–34 in the second quarter.

Management saw the style of several hosts, including Uygur, as off-base from MSNBC's branding objectives that resulted in their demotion. According to Uygur, Phil Griffin, the President of MSNBC disliked his "aggressive style" and told him the network's audience "require different manners of speaking". MSNBC denied Uygur's statements that the network desired censorship of his anti-corporate stances and both sides agreed that their main differences of opinion were about the style of communication. His contract was ended when he was offered to move to weekend slot, but declined. After leaving cable news, Uygur devoted his attention to TYT. Uygur over time became disillusioned with traditional media establishments.

Wolf-PAC

Over the years, Uygur has supported the removal of corporate donations from the political system and he states that "Campaign finance reform" is the "only one issue" in the US. Several Supreme Court rulings (1976, 1978, 2010) on campaign finance motivated Uygur in the midst of the Occupy Wall Street movement to launch a long-term project, a political action committee named Wolf-PAC on October 19, 2011, in New York City. Wolf-PAC aims to lobby state legislators to pass resolutions calling for a Convention of the States under Article V of the US Constitution. Its slogan is "A super-PAC to end all super-PACs". The aim of the convention would be to pass an amendment to the United States Constitution that would end corporate personhood and publicly finance all elections in the United States. , five states have passed the resolution thus calling for such a convention, though not all states have used identical language in their convention call.

Justice Democrats

Uygur is critical of the New Democrats wing of the Democratic party, which he regards as the incumbent political establishment. He has called for the Democratic Party to undergo a revitalization process. On January 23, 2017, three days after the inauguration of President Donald Trump, Uygur co-founded the Justice Democrats along with Kyle Kulinski, a political commentator who had been affiliated with Uygur's Young Turks network. The group seeks to steer the Democratic Party in the strongly progressive, social democratic or democratic socialist direction espoused by U.S. Senator Bernie Sanders. They do this by running progressive candidates in primaries against those whom they consider moderate and conservative Democrats such as Joe Manchin, Joe Crowley, and Dianne Feinstein.

Uygur resigned from his position in Justice Democrats on December 22, 2017, after the discovery of blog posts he had written in the early 2000s, in which he made statements that were described by Justice Democrat leadership as "sexist and racist". The next day, Uygur apologized and denounced his past statements in a video on The Young Turks channel on YouTube, and in an interview with TheWrap said he deleted the "ugly" posts a decade ago because "I don’t stand by them." "The stuff I wrote back then was really insensitive and ignorant," Uygur said. "If you read that today, what I wrote 18 years ago, and you’re offended by it, you’re 100 percent right. And anyone who is subjected to that material, I apologize to. And I deeply regret having written that stuff when I was a different guy." Uygur said he wrote the posts while he was still a conservative, before he underwent a political transformation into a liberal, "I had not yet matured and I was still a conservative who thought that stuff was politically incorrect and edgy." His news organization, The Young Turks, now offers left-leaning stories and commentary. “If someone said that today, I would heavily criticize them on the show and rightfully so, and I have. I’ve criticized myself over the years,” he added.

Congressional candidacy

In mid-November 2019, Uygur filed to run for Congress in California's 25th district, a seat recently vacated by the resignation of Katie Hill, an office also being pursued by Democratic Assemblywoman Christy Smith and former Trump campaign aide George Papadopoulos. Uygur ran in two primary elections on March 3: the special election primary to fill the vacant seat through January 2021 and the Democratic primary for the next full term (decided in the 2020 November election). Uygur raised over $100,000 in small donations in the first three hours since announcing his candidacy. That figure rose to $796,000 in the remainder of the quarter.

Uygur has positioned himself as left-wing, supporting single-payer healthcare, raising the minimum wage to $15 an hour, and overturning Citizens United v. FEC. In the wake of the 2019 Saugus High School shooting, he supported strict gun control laws. He criticized his Democratic opponent, Christy Smith, for her opposition to Medicare for All. Uygur's primary issue was to get money out of politics. He also opposes war with Iran and supports passing the Green New Deal. Uygur's candidacy was initially endorsed by U.S. Senator Bernie Sanders who had to retract his support after crude and degrading comments Uygur had made in recent years about women and provocative statements about Jews, Muslims and other groups were discovered.

Uygur came in fourth place out of 12 candidates with a 6.6% share of the vote. As no candidate earned 50 percent of the vote or more, the top two vote-earners, California Assembly member Christy Smith and navy officer Mike Garcia, advanced to the runoff.

Rebellion PAC
In 2020 he co-founded Rebellion PAC, a political action committee with a focus on running advertisements in support of progressive electoral candidates, alongside Brianna Wu.

Controversies

Denial of Armenian Genocide 

While a student at the University of Pennsylvania, Uygur wrote several articles including a denial of the Armenian genocide and disparaging comments about women.  He disavowed these comments in 2019.

Comments about women 
In the early 2000s Uygur posted a series of blog posts which were described as sexist. one the posts said “I had one of the best nights of my life at Mardi Gras. I kissed over 23 different women, saw and felt countless breasts, and was in a wonderful drunken stupor thanks to my friend John Daniels". Another post said “It seems like there is a sea of tits here, and I am drinking in tiny droplets. I want to dive into the whole god damn ocean". Uygur would delete and later apologize for his comments.

In a 2011 episode of The Young Turks, Uygur and his co host Ana Kasparian dismissed actress Olivia Munn's sexual harassment allegations against director Brett Ratner and Uygur defended Ratner bragging about having sex with Munn saying that she likely “drove him crazy”. Uygur would later apologize for his comments.

In 2013 Uygur made lewd remarks about women's physical appearance in Miami. In 2016 Uygur defended Harvard men soccer team rating female students and sex acts they wanted to enact on them. In 2017 a TYT employee told TheWrap that Uygur made female employees feel uncomfortable when inappropriately discussing women.

Response to unionization of TYT staff 
In February 2020, when the International Alliance of Theatrical Stage Employees sought to unionize The Young Turks, Uygur controversially urged his employees not to. Uygur allegedly fired employee Jacorey Palmer for his pro union activities, and according to an anonymous TYT employee, Uygur withheld bonuses and increases from employees who were involved in the union drive. Uygur denied the charges. Uygur's position towards unions was considered hypocritical due to him being supportive of progressive causes.

Electoral history

Personal life
Uygur was born and raised in a secular Muslim family. He now identifies as an agnostic and as a cultural Muslim. In 2010, along with Ayaan Hirsi Ali, Uygur accepted the "Emperor Has No Clothes Award" from the Freedom From Religion Foundation and later the Humanist Media Award from the American Humanist Association.

He is married to Wendy Lang—a marriage and family therapist—and they have two children.

Uygur is the uncle of political commentator and Twitch streamer Hasan Piker, one of the most watched Twitch streamers in the world.

Uygur, once a Republican, slowly transitioned away from the Republican Party and conservative politics, citing the decision to invade Iraq as a "seminal moment" in that transition. Uygur has claimed to be a progressive, but his comments in regard to women, his treatment of women and anti-worker actions at his own company, as well as his denial of the Armenian genocide have belied this claim. Uygur is a supporter of Bernie Sanders.

References

Further reading

External links

1970 births
21st-century American journalists
Activists from California
Air America people
American abortion-rights activists
American anti–Iraq War activists
American agnostics
American male non-fiction writers
American media critics
American online journalists
American political commentators
American secularists
American social commentators
American talk radio hosts
American television talk show hosts
American YouTubers
Anti-corporate activists
California Democrats
California lawyers
Candidates in the 2020 United States elections
Columbia Law School alumni
Commentary YouTubers
Critics of religions
Current TV people
East Brunswick High School alumni
HuffPost bloggers
Living people
MSNBC people
New Jersey Democrats
New Jersey lawyers
News YouTubers
People from East Brunswick, New Jersey
People with acquired Turkish citizenship
Progressivism in the United States
Radio personalities from Los Angeles
Radio personalities from New Jersey
The Daily Pennsylvanian people
The Young Turks people
Turkish emigrants to the United States
Turkish agnostics
Wharton School of the University of Pennsylvania alumni
Cultural Muslims